The War is a 1994 American drama film directed by Jon Avnet and starring Elijah Wood, Kevin Costner, and Mare Winningham. It is a coming of age tale set in Mississippi in the 1970s. Despite a weak box-office opening and negative reviews, the film gained praise from critics for Wood’s performance.

Plot
Stephen Simmons, a shell-shocked Vietnam veteran, returns from a mental hospital, which he entered voluntarily because he was suffering from nightmares about the war and had in consequence lost three jobs in a row. After having been treated and finally coming home again, he gets a new job as custodial engineer at a grammar school, but loses it again within less than one week because of a law forbidding people who spent time in a mental hospital to work within the vicinity of children. However, the Simmons family desperately needs money, so Stephen continues looking for work, and finds a job picking potatoes. There he makes friends with a man called Moe Henry, with whose help he succeeds in obtaining a job working in a mine - his best one yet.

In the meantime, Stephen's children, twins Lidia and Stu, try to get away from the dreary reality of their lives. They find a tree in a forest close to their house and decide to build a tree house there. At first they and their friends argue over who has to construct it and who is allowed to use it; the three boys - Stu, Chet and Marsh - want it all to themselves, while the girls - Lidia, Elvadine and Amber - want them to work on it and share it afterwards. After several deals, they agree to build the tree house together. The girls get everything they need from a garbage dump being squatted on by the Lipnickis, a neighboring family with a reputation for bullying, who have a grudge against the Simmons and their friends. Unfortunately Billy, the youngest of the Lipnicki kids, discovers Lidia, Elvadine and Amber at the dump, so the girls have to pay him to keep quiet. With his earnings, he purchases many popsicles and goes into a candy coma, which then bring suspicion and anger from his family. He is then forced to give away Lidia's secret.

While the children are busy building their tree house, Stephen and Moe are caught in a collapse as they drain water out of a cavern. Moe is caught under falling rubble, but Stephen, who in Vietnam had to leave his best friend to die in order to be rescued himself, is determined to save him, even if it costs him his own life. He frees Moe, but is hit by falling rocks himself, and though the two men are both rescued, Stephen is badly hurt and comatose, being put on life-support in the hospital.

While Stu and Lidia fear for their father's life, the Lipnickis find the treehouse and take it over, stealing the lock and key, which belonged to Stephen. However, they agree to return them if Stu can win a bet - swimming a lap around the inside of a water-tower while it drains - which he does. The children can keep the place, but not before the Lipnickis throw the key onto the rotted, treacherous roof of the water-tower, telling Stu that if he wants it, he can get it back himself. Shortly afterwards, their father is taken off life-support, and dies. When the kids run away from home to the tree house, they discover that the Lipnickis have returned. In the fight that erupts between them, the tree house is destroyed. Meanwhile, Billy Lipnicki protests against all the fighting, asking why they can't share the fort, but is ignored. He takes it on himself to go to the water tower to retrieve the key, but the roof caves in just as Stu and the others find him, and he almost drowns in the water tower. Stu rescues and resuscitates him together with Lidia, and Billy tells them he saw an angel, one who "looked like [Stu,] only bigger," (implied to be Stephen) who told him he had to stay on Earth and take care of his family.

From that time on the Lipnickis stop fighting with the others and stay out of their way, except for Billy, who becomes a good friend to them. The twins and their friends start to rebuild the tree house, but give it up after a couple of days due to lack of interest. Also, they find out that their father bought them a new house before he died and are happy to have a proper home again at last.

Cast
 Elijah Wood as Stu Simmons
 Kevin Costner as Stephen Simmons
 Mare Winningham as Lois Simmons
 Lexi Faith Randall as Lidia Simmons
 LaToya Chisholm as Elvadine
 Christopher Fennell as Billy Lipnicki
 Donald Sellers as Arliss Lipnicki
 Leon Sills as Leo Lipnicki
 Will West as Lester Lucket
 Bruce A. Young as Moe Henry
 Brennan Gallagher as Marsh
 Jennifer Tyler as Ula Lipnicki
 Lucas Black as Ebb Lipnicki
 Christine Baranski as Miss Strapford
 Charlette Julius as Amber

Production
The film was purchased in February 1993 by Island World who paid $500,000 cash for the spec script by Kathy McWorter. Kevin Costner joined the film in June 1993. Principal photography wrapped in April 1994.

Critical response
Wood earned praise for his role, as did Costner, but the film itself received mostly negative reviews from critics who criticized the script and Avnet's directing. It currently holding a 25% rating on Rotten Tomatoes based on 16 reviews. Roger Ebert of the Chicago Sun-Times gave the film two stars out of four, criticizing the fusion of war trauma and intimate family drama. However, he did praise Wood, saying:

Janet Maslin of The New York Times praised Costner and Wood's performances, saying the father-son bond was the film's strongest element. However, Maslin felt that the film “contends with too many minor plot threads and a too-wrenching switch of gears late in the story. As written atmospherically but sometimes preachily by Kathy McWorter, it incorporates a wider array of lessons than it can comfortably handle.' Brian Lowry of Variety called the film, “earnest but over-cooked”, criticizing its use of the Vietnam War as “heavy-handed”. Lisa Schwarzbaum of Entertainment Weekly gave the film a C+, but gave commendations to Costner, writing, “He’s nicely weighted (figuratively and literally, with an attractive hint of middle-aged bulk — hey, the guy looks great). And in a plot heavy with sentimentality, he maintains a light touch.” Schwarzbaum also gave praise to Wood, but complained that Avnet and screenwriter Kathy McWorter were too-heavy-handed in their storytelling choices. Empire, by contrast, gave the film four stars, deeming it “a superior movie that matches intelligent metaphor with outstanding performances.”

Awards nominations 
Elijah Wood was nominated for a YoungStar Award in the category of Best Performance by a Young Actor in a Drama Film while Lexi Randall was nominated for a Young Artist Award in the category of Best Performance by a Young Actress Co-Starring in a Motion Picture.

Notes

External links
 
 
 

1994 films
Vietnam War films
1990s coming-of-age drama films
1990s English-language films
Films directed by Jon Avnet
Films set in Mississippi
Films set in the 1970s
Films shot in Georgia (U.S. state)
Films shot in South Carolina
Universal Pictures films
Films scored by Thomas Newman
1994 drama films
Films about veterans
Films about post-traumatic stress disorder
Films about father–son relationships
Films about siblings
American coming-of-age drama films
1990s American films